710 Gertrud is a Themistian asteroid, which means it is a member of the Themis family of asteroids. It was discovered by Austrian astronomer Johann Palisa on 28 February 1911 from Vienna.

References

External links 
 
 

Themis asteroids
Gertrud
19110228
Gertrud